Tractive is an Austrian company that develops real-time location trackers for pets and other animals using GPS and GSM technology.

Overview 
Developed by Michael Hurnaus, their real-time location tracking device, Tractive GPS can be used via a Smartphone application or web interface. It tracks the device's positions using GPS and transfers the data using GSM technology.  It has a clip mechanism that can be attached to a collar and weighs approximately 1.4 ounces. The device can be used for animals who are 9 pounds or heavier and can be used for  multiple pets. The tracker is waterproof and has an optional replacement plan. It has a geofencing feature that allows for the creation of virtual fences and sends notifications when the pet enters or exits them.

It can be used in over 175 countries, and has a battery life of 3 to 5 days, depending on network and usage.

Tractive GPS requires a paid subscription to track your pet. The basic package includes GPS tracking and unlimited LIVE tracking. The premium package has both GPS Tracking and unlimited LIVE Tracking plus it also includes worldwide coverage, unlimited location history, shared access with other accounts, premium customer service, and you can also export the location history of your pet dogs using a GPX or a KML file.

Capitalization 
It raised $500k in 2012 and €2m from former race car driver Harold Primat in 2016. In 2018 they raised an additional '7-digit' Euro sum from Monkfish Equity, the investment vehicle of the founders of Trivago.

Awards 

 Tractive received the best team award from Kununu.
 Tractive received the award for third place in the Best Workplace Award 2018 from Kununu.
 Tractive has been awarded the Born Global Champion Award.
 Tractive received the  Innovation of the Year award at Futurezone Award 2014.
 Tractive received the Edison Award, 2013.
 Tractive has been included in the list of the best dog GPS trackers in 2021 by Technobark.

References 

Software companies of Austria